Cosmic Dancer may refer to:

 "Cosmic Dancer", song by British rock band T. Rex (band) from their 1971 album Electric Warrior
 Cosmic Dancer (sculpture), flown 1993–2001 aboard space station Mir, created by American-Swiss artist Arthur Woods
 Cosmic Dancer, a 2011 compilation album by British pop-rock project Shakespears Sister